Marcel-Frédéric Lubin-Lebrère (July 21, 1891 – July 7, 1972) was a French rugby union player who competed in the 1924 Summer Olympics.

An article on French rugby by Paul Rees in the UK newspaper "The Guardian' on 14 January 2021 included the following:

"Only one player from the 1914 side was involved in 1920, the Toulouse prop and occasional second-row Marcel-Frédéric Lubin-Lebrère, who was a survivor in more than one sense. Left for dead after being shot 14 times during the Somme, he was taken captive by the Germans. When he returned home, he had lost the sight in one eye.

He was arrested the night before the match in Dublin, along with his teammates Théophile Cambre and Jean Sébédio, for singing revolutionary songs in a pub with sympathisers of the IRA at a time of the Irish war of independence. They were released in time to play on a rainy day in April when France made light of the conditions to win 15-7."

He was born in Agen and died in Toulouse.

In 1924 he won the silver medal as member of the French team.

References

External links
profile

1891 births
1972 deaths
Sportspeople from Agen
French military personnel of World War I
French rugby union players
Olympic rugby union players of France
Rugby union players at the 1924 Summer Olympics
Olympic silver medalists for France
France international rugby union players
Medalists at the 1924 Summer Olympics